

Legend

List

References

2010-11